Brighton Ballet Theater is an American School of Russian Ballet and  a nonprofit dance organization. Established in 1987, it is situated in Manhattan Beach area of Brooklyn and located on the campus of Kingsborough Community College of the City University of New York.

Overview
Three hundred students are enrolled and an additional five hundred students participate through programs in New York City public schools. Brighton Ballet Theater instructors are professionally trained dancers who studied in Russian, Ukrainian or American institutions. In addition, the instructors have performing, teaching and choreographing experience at  ballet companies of the former Soviet Union, and the USA.

Each year Brighton Ballet Theater holds two large-scale productions and countless presentations at various special events in the Tri-state area. The school hosts the Annual Children's Festival "The World of Dance" and performances of The Nutcracker (VIDEO) at the Leon M. Goldstein Performing Arts Center

Brighton Ballet Theater also has a Summer Dance Programs, A la carte, and Summer Intensive Program,  held in June through August of every year.

Selected productions
 Ballet Carlson who lives on the Roof, 1992
 Ballet Les Sylphides, 1993, and 1999
 Ballet In the Snow Queen Kingdom, 1993
 Ballet Classical Symphony, 1997
 Grand Pas from the ballet Paquita, 1997
 Excerpts from the ballet: The Sleeping Beauty 1998
 Excerpts from the ballet Coppélia, 2000
 Ballet The Four Seasons, 2002
 Ballet The Radish, 2002 - VIDEO
 Ballet The Nanny's Story on the music by Pyotr Tchaikovsky, 2003 - VIDEO
 Ballet The Ugly Duckling, 2004 - VIDEO
 Ballet The Sunrise, 2005 - VIDEO
 Ballet The Orchestra, 2006
 Ballet Aria, 2007
 "The Kingdom of the Shades" from Petipa's ballet La Bayadère, 2008
 Grand Pas Classique from ballet Paquita, 2008
 Ballet "The Sunrise", 2009     
 Ballet "The Four Seasons", 2009
 Ballet "The Enormous Turnip", 2009
 Ballet "The Ugly Duckling", 2010
 Ballet "The Four Seasons" (by Vivaldi), 2011
 Ballet "The White Swans", 2011
 "Déjà Vu" (Bach), 2011
 BBT's Tribute Honoring Igor Moiseyev, 2011
 Excerpts from ballet "Paquita" by Ludwig Minkus, 2012
 Divertissement from the 3rd act of Tchaikovsky's "Swan Lake", 2012
 "The Kingdom of the Shades" from Petipa's ballet La Bayadère, 2012
 Ballet "Chopiniana", 2013     
 “Dream” Scene from ballet “Don Quixote”, 2013 
 Excerpts from Tchaikovsky's "The Sleeping Beauty", 2014
 Ballet "The Giant Turnip", 2014
 Ballet "The Four Seasons: by A. Vivaldi, 2014
 Excerpts from ballet "Paquita", 2015 
 “Coming to America” Special, 2015
 Excerpts from ballet “Swan Lake”, 2015
 Ballet "The Sunrise", 2015
 Ballet "The Carnival of the Animals" by Camille Saint-Saëns (Excerpts), 2015
 Ballet Orchestra'', 2016
 Scenes from ballet "Cinderella" on the music by Sergey Prokofiev, 2016
 Divertissement from the 3rd act of Tchaikovsky's ballet "Swan Lake", 2017
 Ballet "Cinderella" on the music by Giuseppe Verdi, 2018
 Ballet "The Sunrise", 2019    
 Ballet "The Twelve Months" on the music by Pyotr Tchaikovsky, 2019
 Ballet "Peter and the Wolf" on the music by Sergei Prokofiev, 2022

References

 New York Daily News: Keeping locals on their toes. Date: MAY 10, 2007
 Classical ballet, far from home - BBC News Magazine Date: April 16, 2012  
 Russian Ballet, Brooklyn Flavor - Slide Show - NYTimes.com Date: November 27, 2011
 Brighton Ballet Theater's version of Tchaikovsky classic is no hard 'Nut'Date: December 12, 2010
 BrooklynHistory.org/blog - FOLK FEET: Irina Roizin. Written by Sady on September 23rd, 2009
 NYTimes.com Blog: Taking Liberties With Tchaikovsky. Date: December 5, 2007
 New York Daily News: Keeping Locals on Their Toes. Celebrations mark 20 years of Brighton Ballet. Date: Thursday, May 10th, 2007
 New York Daily News: Seamless teamwork at Brighton ballet. Date: December 7, 2003
 The New York Times: Bolshoi to Brooklyn, in a Bound. Date: June 15th, 2003

External links
  
 
 
 BrightonBallet on YouTube.com

Ballet companies in the United States
Ballet schools in the United States
Dance schools in the United States
Dance in New York City
Russian ballet
Performing arts education in New York City
1987 establishments in the United States
Performing groups established in 1987
Brighton Beach
Russian-American culture in New York City